Also called tagutok (Maranao), bantula or tagungtung (Bukidnon) and kuratung (Banuwaen).

The kagul is a type of Philippine bamboo scraper gong/slit drum of the Maguindanaon and Visayans with a jagged edge on one side, played with two beaters, one scraping the jagged edge and the other one making a beat. The Maguindanaon and the Banuwaen use it in the rice paddies to guard against voracious birds, using the sound it produces to scare them away. The Maguindanaon and the Bukidnon also used to use it for simple dance rhythms during social occasions. The rhythms were usually simplistic in nature, consisting of one rhythmic pattern sometimes combined with another. Use of the kagul in the former way is no longer practiced.

See also
Slim (musical instrument)

References

External links

Informational websites and online textbooks

Pictures of kagul and its other derivatives
Photograph of a Bantula – Close-up pictures of a bantula - by Hans Brandeis.
Photograph of a Tagungtung - A tagungtung used as accompaniment - by Hans Brandeis.
Photograph of a Tagungtung - A tagungtung being played - by Hans Brandeis.
Photograph of a Tagutok – Close-up pictures of a tagutok - by Fekke de Jagar.

Culture of Maguindanao del Norte
Culture of Maguindanao del Sur
Culture of Bukidnon
Scraped idiophones
Slit drums
Philippine folk instruments
Philippine musical instruments